Steinkopf is a German word literally meaning "stone head". Some slightly different spellings such as Steinkopff exist. It may refer to:

People
Aryane Steinkopf, Brazilian model and MMA ring girl.
Carla Steinkopf (born 1973), Miss Venezuela International of 1995
Friedrich Wilhelm Steinkopf (1842–1911), German civil servant, former mayor of the towns of Kleve and Mülheim am Rhein
Karl Steinkopf (de) (1773–1859), foreign secretary on the British and Foreign Bible Society
Maitland Steinkopf (1912–1970), Canadian politician of the Progressive Conservative Party of Manitoba
Max Steinkopf, co-founder of GB Railways
Pete Steinkopf, guitarist of New Jerseyan punk rock band The Bouncing Souls
Theodor Steinkopff (1870–1955), German publisher, founder of the Verlag Theodor Steinkopff
Wilhelm Steinkopf (1879–1949), German chemist, involved in the development of mustard gas during World War I
Willy Steinkopf (1885–1953), German politician of the Social Democratic Party of Germany

Places
Steinkopf, Northern Cape, a town in the Northern Cape province of South Africa
Several hills and mountains in Hesse, Germany:
Steinkopf (Fuldatal) in the Fuldatal municipality
Steinkopf (Gutsbezirks Reinhardswald) (northwest), part of the Reinhardswald
Steinkopf (Hochtaunuskreis) in the Hochtaunuskreis district
Steinkopf (Odenwald), part of the Odenwald
Steinkopf (Rhön), part of the Rhön Mountains
Steinkopf (Südostteil des Gutsbezirks Reinhardswald), part of the Reinhardswald
Steinkopf (Wetteraukreis) in the Wetteraukreis district
Several hills and mountains in Rhineland-Palatinate, Germany:
Steinkopf (Pfalz) in the Palatinate Forest
Steinkopf (Westerwald), part of the Westerwald

Other
Verlag J. F. Steinkopf, German publishing company based in Stuttgart, Germany
Verlag Theodor Steinkopff, German publishing company based in Dresden, Germany